Futbol Klub 13, or simply FK 13 Sofia is a Bulgarian football club based in Sofia. In his history the club won two Bulgarian Cups in 1938 and 1940. Football Club 13 is a football club in Sofia that existed independently between 1909 and 1944, and again from 2018 to the present.

History
The beginning of FC-13 was laid in the spring of 1909. Bulgarian students, studying at the Galatasaray Lyceum in Constantinople, formed a football team. His name is Sava in honor of Sava Kirov - one of the pioneers of sport in Sofia, and also the founder of the club. After the end of the school year students return to Sofia.

The club was officially founded in October 1913. It is wrong to think that the number 13 is due to the year of the club's official establishment. This figure is due to the 13 students who founded the team in 1909.

FC-13 together with Varna Sportist are the founders of club football in Bulgaria. They're called "veterans." In the early years, Sava Kirov was the captain of the team, the assailant, the secretary and the treasurer. The chairman is until 1920. There were 12 children's clubs with football teams to the club. The area of the club covers the neighborhood between Evlogi Georgiev Boulevard, the streets of Graf Ignatiev, Parensov, Yuriy Venelin and Lyuben Karavelov or the so-called Aligina Mahala in Sofia. The club playground was located on the site of the old Russian cemetery, next to the current "Vasil Levski" stadium. The course is done on a voluntary basis. There was a two-story wooden rostrum, and on the upper floor there was a room for office and household. In the summer of 1928, the municipal authorities took away the pitch and joined it to the neighboring plot of the Yunak company. This team, apart from being the first winner of the royal cup in 1938, gives Bulgaria and 16 nationals. The most famous is Todor Mistelov, a Balkan champion. Goalkeeper Nikola Savov was named number 1 on the peninsula, under 20, in 1935. Lozan Kotsev became champion of Switzerland with Lozansport in the following year and started his career in FC-13. His picture is also Friedrich Klid, the first foreigner to play with the team of Bulgaria. The club combines mostly intelligent and educated people - current or future lawyers, doctors, diplomats, bank officials, graduates of His Majesty's Military School. The FC-13 later developed volleyball, basketball, ice hockey. The club existed independently until October 3, 1944.

In 2018, Bulgarian football coach Kristian Rangelov together with another 6 managerial board regrouped the company. The club is currently developing kids and teen football for boys and girls, and is starting men's team for 2018-19 season in Bulgarian fourth division.

Honours
Bulgarian Cup:
Winners (2): 1938, 1940
Ulpia Serdica Cup:
Runners-up (4): 1930, 1931, 1935, 1937
Sofia First Division:
Champions (1): 1941
National Division:
4th place (1): 1938
State Championship:
5th place (1): 1941

References
https://fc-13.com/ 
https://www.facebook.com/footballclub13/

Association football clubs established in 1909
Association football clubs disestablished in 1944
Football clubs in Sofia
FC 13 Sofia
FC 13 Sofia